Rhynchospora holoschoenoides, known by the common name of fly beaksedge, is a member of the sedge family, Cyperaceae. It is a perennial herb, found throughout the Caribbean, Central and South America and western and southern Africa. 

Rhynchospora holoschoenoides grows between 40 to 130 centimeters tall in swamps and ponds. It features distinctive spherical spikelets at the ends of its branches, a trait it shares with Rhynchospora rubra subsp. africana, but can be distinguished by the presence of spikelets on multiple branches, whereas R. rubra possesses only a single spikelet on its central stem.

References

External links

holoschoenoides
Flora of South America
Flora of Central America
Flora of the Caribbean
Flora of West Tropical Africa
Flora of Southern Africa
Flora of Madagascar
Plants described in 1792
Plants described in 1953